Jānis Leitis (born 13 April 1989 in Riga) is a Latvian athlete who usually competes in 400m and long jump.

Leitis is the 2009 European U23 champion in long jump. He is the national record holder in the 400 m (45.53, 2018).

Achievements

Personal bests

References

External links
 
 

1989 births
Living people
Athletes from Riga
Latvian male sprinters
Latvian male long jumpers
Athletes (track and field) at the 2012 Summer Olympics
Olympic athletes of Latvia
European Games competitors for Latvia
Athletes (track and field) at the 2019 European Games